Brydan Klein and Matt Reid were the defending champions but only Reid defended his title, partnering John-Patrick Smith.

Reid successfully defended his title, defeating Jeevan Nedunchezhiyan and Christopher Rungkat 6–3, 6–4 in the final.

Seeds

Draw

References
 Main Draw

Dunlop World Challenge
2016 MD
2016 ATP Challenger Tour